Domestic spending  may refer to:

Consumption (economics) 
Investment (macroeconomics) 
Government spending

Other:
 Domestic Spending (horse), a British-bred American-owned Thoroughbred race horse